Corilair is a chartered and scheduled floatplane airline based in Campbell River, British Columbia, Canada. The airline primarily flies to smaller islands within British Columbia, Canada from Campbell River and Vancouver International Airport.

Offices 
The airline holds an office in Campbell River, British Columbia.

Destinations  
 Vancouver International Airport, South Terminal, seasonal
 The Discovery Islands
 Dent Island
 Stuart Island
 Refuge Cove
 Savary Island
 Cortes Island
 Blind Channel
 Desolation Island
 Pender Harbour
 Sechelt
 Campbell Island

Fleet
As of February 2021, Transport Canada listed four aircraft registered to Corilair:

References

Regional airlines of British Columbia
Companies based in British Columbia
Campbell River, British Columbia
Seaplane operators